North Smithfield Historic District is a national historic district located at  Smithfield, Johnston County, North Carolina.  It encompasses 120 contributing buildings, 3 contributing sites, and 1 contributing structure in a predominantly residential section of Smithfield.  It includes notable examples of Italianate and Queen Anne style architecture and buildings dating from about the 1850s through the 1940s. Notable buildings include the Lunceford-Narron House (c. 1885), Massey-Wilson House (c. 1885), Stevens-Mattox House (c. 1910), Allred-Pou-Wellons-McGowan House (c. 1905), (former) Smithfield Water Power Plant (c. 1913), and St Ann's Catholic Church (1935).

It was listed on the National Register of Historic Places in 2000.

References

Houses on the National Register of Historic Places in North Carolina
Historic districts on the National Register of Historic Places in North Carolina
Italianate architecture in North Carolina
Queen Anne architecture in North Carolina
Houses in Johnston County, North Carolina
National Register of Historic Places in Johnston County, North Carolina
Buildings and structures in Smithfield, North Carolina